The 2019 Rugby Europe Women’s U18 Sevens Championship was held in Jarocin, Poland from 31 August - 1 September, 2019. 16 teams competed in the tournament. France won the championship. Home Nations teams competed in a Home Nations Sevens tournament as a build-up to the competition. Scotland made their debut at the tournament and finished in 6th place.

Teams

Pool stages

Pool A

Pool B

Pool C

Pool D

Finals 
13th-16th Semi-finals

9th-16th Quarter-finals

5th-8th Semi-finals

Cup Finals

Final standings

References 

2019–20 in European women's rugby union
Rugby Europe Women's U18
Rugby Europe Women's U18
International rugby union competitions hosted by Poland
U18